The FA Cup 1970–71 is the 90th season of the world's oldest football knockout competition; The Football Association Challenge Cup, or FA Cup for short. The large number of clubs entering the tournament from lower down the English football league system meant that the competition started with a number of preliminary and qualifying rounds. The 28 victorious teams from the Fourth Round Qualifying progressed to the First Round Proper.

Preliminary round

Ties

Replay

1st qualifying round

Ties

Replays

2nd replay

3rd replay

2nd qualifying round

Ties

Replays

3rd replays

3rd qualifying round

Ties

Replays

3rd replay

4th qualifying round
The teams that given byes to this round are Bradford Park Avenue, Sutton United, Wimbledon, Yeovil Town, Hereford United, South Shields, Chelmsford City, Weymouth, Grantham, Altrincham, Oxford City, Barnet, Kettering Town, Margate, Bangor City, Cheltenham Town, Hillingdon Borough, Wigan Athletic, Hendon and Tamworth.

Ties

Replays

2nd replays

1970–71 FA Cup
See 1970-71 FA Cup for details of the rounds from the First Round Proper onwards.

External links
 Football Club History Database: FA Cup 1970–71
 FA Cup Past Results

Qualifying Rounds
FA Cup qualifying rounds